Live and Eclectic is the second solo live album by Ronnie Wood. It was recorded at the Electric Lady Studios in New York and at the Rhythm Café in San Diego.

Track listing 
 "Show Me" (Jerry Williams)
 "Flying" (Ronnie Wood, Rod Stewart, Ronnie Lane)
 "Testify" (George Clinton, Deron Taylor)
 "Pretty Beat Up" (Mick Jagger, Keith Richards, Ron Wood)
 "Always Wanted More" (Ronnie Wood, Bernard Fowler)
 "Breathe on Me"(Ronnie Wood)
 "Silicone Grown" (Ronnie Wood, Rod Stewart)
 "Black Limousine" (Mick Jagger, Keith Richards, Ronnie Wood)
 "Little Red Rooster" (Willie Dixon)
 "Stay With Me" (Ronnie Wood, Rod Stewart)
 "Josephine" (Ronnie Wood, Bernard Fowler)
 "I'm Losing You" (Norman Whitfield, Eddie Holland, Cornelius Grant)
 "It's Only Rock 'n Roll" (Mick Jagger, Keith Richards)

Bonus CD 
 "Flying" (Ronnie Wood, Rod Stewart, Ronnie Lane)
 "Silicone Grown" (Ronnie Wood, Rod Stewart)
 "Stay With Me" (Ronnie Wood, Rod Stewart)
 "Somebody Else (Give Me Up)" (Ronnie Wood, Bernard Fowler)
 "I Can Feel the Fire" (Ronnie Wood)

Personnel 
 Ronnie Wood - vocals, guitar, harmonica
 Johnny Lee Schell - guitar
 Shaun Solomon - bass
 Bernard Fowler - vocals
 Ian McLagan - keyboards
 Chuck Leavell - additional keyboards except on "Josephine", "I'm Losing You" and "It's Only Rock 'n Roll"
 Wayne P. Sheehy -  drums

References

Ronnie Wood albums
Albums recorded at Electric Lady Studios
2000 live albums